Kathleen Ann Kavalec is an American diplomat who has served as the United States ambassador to Romania since February 2023. She is a former nominee to be the United States ambassador to Albania under President Donald Trump.

Early life and education
Kavalec earned her bachelor of arts in political science from the University of California at Berkeley and a master of science in foreign service from Georgetown University.

Career

Kavalec is a career member of the Senior Foreign Service, with the rank of minister-counselor. She has served as the head of mission at the Organization for Security and Co-operation in Europe (OSCE) Mission to Bosnia and Herzegovina since 2019. Previously, she served as deputy assistant secretary in the Bureau of European and Eurasian Affairs. Kavalec also served as the director of the Office of Russian Affairs and the deputy chief of mission of the U.S. mission UNESCO in Paris, France. Kavalec was responsible for overseeing major U.S. foreign assistance programs as deputy coordinator for assistance in the European Bureau, and as director for conflict prevention in the Office of the Coordinator for Reconstruction and Stabilization. Kavalec has served in Bucharest, Romania, Kyiv, Ukraine and Moscow, Russia. Domestically, she served as a legislative management officer in the Bureau of Legislative Affairs and has also served as director of the economic unit in the office of the coordinator for assistance for the New Independent States.

Nomination as United States ambassador to Albania 

On July 3, 2018, President Donald Trump nominated Kavalec to be the next United States ambassador to Albania. Her nomination expired at the end of the year and was ultimately returned to Trump.

United States ambassador to Romania 

On June 3, 2022, President Joe Biden nominated Kavalec to be the United States ambassador to Romania. Hearings on her nomination were held before the Senate Foreign Relations Committee on November 29, 2022. The committee favorably reported the nomination on December 7, 2022. On December 15, 2022, her nomination was confirmed by in the Senate by voice vote. She was sworn in on December 20, 2022, and presented her credentials to President Klaus Iohannis on February 14, 2023.

Awards and recognitions
Kavalec has won numerous State Department awards, as well as the Presidential Rank Award.

Personal life
Kavalec is a native of California. She speaks Romanian, Spanish, Portuguese, French, and Russian.

References

External links

Living people
Year of birth missing (living people)
Ambassadors of the United States to Romania
American women ambassadors
United States Foreign Service personnel
University of California, Berkeley alumni
Walsh School of Foreign Service alumni
American women diplomats